On the club, national and international level, men's netball teams exist, but attract less attention than women's netball. Mixed teams are not uncommon in Australia and are very popular. Men's national teams do exist in Antigua & Barbuda, Australia, Brunei, Canada, England, Fiji, Hong Kong, India, the Isle of Man, Jamaica, Kenya, Malaysia, New Zealand, Pakistan, Papua New Guinea, Singapore, Grenada, St. Vincent & the Grenadines, South Africa, Uganda, the United Arab Emirates and Zambia.

In 1997, in England male participation comprised 0.7% of the total netball playing population within schools. Unlike women's netball at elite and national levels, men's and mixed gendered teams in countries like Fiji, Australia and New Zealand are largely self-funded. When administrators attend conferences for men's and mixed gendered netball, they also have to pay most of their own costs.

History
Netball started to become popular for male players in Australia during the 1980s as men started to watch the sport that their wives and girlfriends were participating in. In Australia, the sport began to be played with the appearance of mixed gendered social teams. In 1985, the first Australian Championship were held in Geelong. The levels contested included: Open, Open Reserves, 21 and Under, 19 and Under, 17 and Under and Masters. The South Australian Mens Netball Association was founded in 1998.

In 2000, the national organisation basically collapsed because of a lack of interest. In 2001, the South Australians tried to recreate the national organisation under their own state organisation, calling it the Australian International Mens and Mixed Netball Association. The new organisation held its first Australian Championships in 2002 for men's and mixed teams. In 2003, New Zealand entered a national team in the Open Mens Division and won.

In 2004, New Zealand and Fiji sent teams to compete in the Australian Mixed and Men's National Championships. On 6 August 2004, the men's national organisations for Fiji, Cook Islands, New Zealand and Australia attended a meeting where they agreed to form the International Men's and Mixed Netball Association. The following day, the organisation's first official meeting was held. The group decided that the International Men's and Mixed Challenge in August 2006 would be the first event they would organise, and that the event would be held in Fiji.

The 2009 International Challenge Men's and Mixed Netball Tournament was held in the Cook Islands. Currently, the International Federation of Netball Associations only recognises women's netball.

The 2011 International Challenge Men's and Mixed Netball Tournament was run by the Western Australian Men's and Mixed Netball Association (WAMMNA). It is the major international competition for men's and mixed gendered national netball teams. In the 2011 competition held in April, men's national teams from Samoa, Fiji, Australia, New Zealand and the Cook Islands are a few that will compete.

In 2017 the Australian Championships, held on the Gold Coast, were live streamed for the first time. There were nearly 140,000 viewers around the world who viewed the last 43 matches on the final four days of competition. The first Asian Men's Netball Championship 2016, held in Putrajaya, Malaysia, was live streamed on Facebook. Malaysia won the final over Pakistan in a thrilling match overtime match which Malaysia won by 2 goals, while India beat Brunei to win the bronze medal. Hong Kong finished fifth.

The 2018 Australian Championships was planned to take place at Genea Netball Centre from 1–7 April.

The 2018 Trans-Tasman Cup was to bebe contested between Australia and New Zealand across four divisions (U20, U23, Open Mixed and Open Men's) from 23–28 October at Priceline Stadium in Adelaide.

On 26 June 2019, the New Zealand Men's Netball side competed in their first televised match, beating the Fiji Women's team, the Pearls, 93–19. On 29 June 2019, the men's team won the Cadbury Netball Series against the Silver Ferns 66–54, for their first international series win.

Men's Netball in Australia

State member organisations
 Sunshine State Men's and Mixed Netball Association (QLD)
 Men's Netball NSW (NSW) - 
 Victoria Men's and Mixed Netball (VIC)
 South Australia Men's and Mixed Netball (SA)
 Western Australia Men's and Mixed Netball (WA)
 Tasmania Men's and Mixed Netball Association (TAS)
 Australian Defence Force (ADF)
 Australian Capital Territory Men's Netball (ACT)

West Australian Netball League
Between 2001 and 2004 the West Australian Netball League featured a men's netball division. Perth Bullets were the inaugural premiers. Coastals won the other three titles.  The men's division was relaunched in 2018 featuring four teams – West Coast Warriors, Perth Lions, South East Demons and Wheatbelt Flames. West Coast Warriors would go on to win the first two titles.

Men's Netball in England 
In England, men's and mixed netball is governed by the England Men's & Mixed Netball Association.  2020 trials were held for the England men's and mixed national netball squad that were to compete at the now postponed inaugural men's and mixed netball World Cup in Perth Australia. Knights men's netball team was established in 2018 and has seen them grow to three teams.

2021 the inaugural England Men's & Mixed Netball Association National Championships was held at Nottingham Trent University, with the London Giants winning the men's and mixed national titles. 

National men's netball teams in England

 London Giants Netball (2021 National Champions)
 Knights Mens Netball
 Northern Titans (Leeds)
 Spartans (Manchester)
 Hawks (South West)
 Nottingham Trent University
 Norfolk United (Norwich)
 North East Men
 Army Men (Aldershot)

National mixed netball teams in England
 London Giants Netball (2021 National Champions)
 Spartans (Manchester)
 Warwick University
 South West Hawks
 Army Mixed (Aldershot)

References

Netball variants